Appeal to motive is a pattern of argument which consists in challenging a thesis by calling into question the motives of its proposer.  It can be considered as a special case of the ad hominem circumstantial argument.  As such, this type of argument may be an informal fallacy.

A common feature of appeals to motive is that only the possibility of a  motive (however small) is shown, without showing the motive actually existed or, if the motive did exist, that the motive played a role in forming the argument and its conclusion. Indeed, it is often assumed that the mere  possibility of motive is evidence enough.

Examples 
 "That website recommended ACME's widget over Megacorp's widget. But the website also displays ACME advertising on their site, so they were probably biased in their review."  The thesis in this case is the website's evaluation of the relative merits of the two products.
 "The referee is a New York City native, so his refereeing was obviously biased towards New York teams." In this case, the thesis consists of the referee's rulings.
 "My opponent argues on and on in favor of allowing that mall to be built in the center of town. What he won't tell you is that his daughter and her friends plan to shop there once it's open."
 "The prosecuter argues my client committed this crime. However, my client is black, and the prosecuter has shown she hates black people before." In this case, the thesis would also be related to the race card, alleging (Correctly or incorreclty) racism is influencing the prosecuter's actions.

Examples of 2 sides using "appeal to motive" on the same issue:
 The Democrats want to impeach a President for withholding aid until he received a "personal favor" with Ukraine, and to "dig up dirt on a political opponent". The witnesses however admit this to be "speculation" and "presumption".
 "The Democrats wanted to impeach the President long before this Ukraine thing came out, so this Ukraine thing cannot be anything more than a hoax that comes from their sheer hatred of the President."

See also 

 
 Bulverism
 Call-out culture
 Conflict of interest
 Cui bono
 Race card
 Shooting the messenger
 Woman card

References 

Genetic fallacies